Pierre Sonnerat (18 August 1748 – 31 March 1814) was a French naturalist, colonial administrator, writer and explorer. He described numerous species of plants and animals on his travels and is honoured in the genus Sonneratia and in other specific names such as that of the grey junglefowl Gallus sonneratii.

Life and travels 
Sonnerat was born in Lyon and was the nephew of the botanist Pierre Poivre (mother of Pierre Sonnerat, Benoîte Poivre, was a cousine of Pierre Poivre) who was a French colonial administrator in the Mascarenes. Sonnerat became a private secretary to his uncle Pierre and made several voyages to southeast Asia, visiting the Philippines and Moluccas between 1769 and 1772.  In Mauritius Sonnerat met the naturalist Philibert Commerson in 1767 and worked for him briefly, travelling to Reunion. He then worked as a naval commissar and travelled to India and China from 1774 to 1781 with a base in Yanam and Pondicherry. From 1781 to 1785 he was in France where he married Marguerite Ménissier. In 1786 he was posted in Pondicherry. Travelling around the Cape of Good Hope, he examined parts of southern Africa, southern India and Sri Lanka. In 1789 he was posted at Yanam and in 1795 he was briefly held prisoner of war by the English administration as England and France had gone to war. Sonnerat returned to Europe in 1813, meeting Joseph Banks in London and returned to Paris in 1814 where he died.

Natural history 
Sonnerat collected bird and plant specimens on his travels. He was the first person to give a scientific description of the south Chinese fruit tree lychee. It has been claimed that Sonnerat misinterpreted the call of a helpful Malagasy guide who had spotted a lemur and shouted "indri!" ("look!" in Malagasy). Sonnerat supposedly took this by "mistake" to be the animal's name, and it was called the Indri (Indri indri). This claim has been re-examined and it would appear that Sonnerat actually recorded a local name endrina which is still in use.  The birds Dacelo novaeguineae and Pygoscelis papua, neither of which are found in New Guinea (Papua), were also misnamed due to Sonnerat. His books included Voyage à la Nouvelle-Guinée (1776)  and  Voyage aux Indes orientales et à la Chine, fait depuis 1774 jusqu'à 1781 (1782). The standard botanical author abbreviation Sonn. is applied to plants he described. His name is used in the specific name of the grey junglefowl (Gallus sonneratii).

A species of shrew in the genus Crocidura (or Diplomesodon) which has been described based on his manuscripts as Diplomesodon sonnerati is thought to have become extinct and was collected from around Pondicherry.

See also
 European and American voyages of scientific exploration

References

Biography
 Ly-Tio-Fane, Madeleine (1976). Pierre Sonnerat 1748–1814. An account of his life and work. Self published. Mauritius.

External links
 Voyage a la Nouvelle Guinée − by Pierre Sonnerat (1776) Linda Hall Library Biblioteca Digital Real Jardin Botanico
  Gallica.bnf.fr: Illustrations de Voyage à la Nouvelle Guinée — 
 Collection de planches pour servir au Voyage aux Indes Orientales et a la Chine

French explorers
French naturalists
1748 births
1814 deaths
Botanists active in China
Botanists active in India
Botanists active in the Pacific
Botanists with author abbreviations
18th-century explorers
18th-century French botanists
19th-century French botanists
18th-century French zoologists
19th-century French zoologists
Scientists from Lyon